Yellow Bellflower is a cultivar of domesticated apple that originated in New Jersey. It has many other names including "Belle Flavoise" and "Lincoln Pippin". It is probably the best known of a group of apple cultivars referred to as the yellow bellflower group, with fruit that are generally elongated, with largely yellow skin. Along with the Yellow Bellflower, the Ortley is the oldest of the group.

See also
Bellflower, California, named after the apple
Bellflower, Illinois, named after the apple

References

Wordpress

Apple cultivars
Bellflower, California
American apples